Ouna  refer to:
 Ouna, County Antrim, a townland in County Antrim, Northern Ireland (also known as Eagle Hill)
 Õuna, a town in Estonia
 Ouna, a Japanese satellite